Veligosti (before 1918: Σαμαρά - Samara) is a settlement in the municipal unit of Falaisia, Arcadia, Greece. It is situated on a low hill, on the left bank of a tributary of the river Alfeios. It is 2 km west of Leontari, 3 km north of Ellinitsa, 4 km east of Paradeisia and 9 km south of Megalopoli.

Population

History

Veligosti was founded during the Byzantine era and the ruins of the Byzantine settlement and a tower are still visible today. During the Frankish period, according to the Chronicle of the Morea, Geoffrey I Villehardouin made it a barony (one of the twelve in the Peloponnese). The barony was destroyed in about 1300, and during the Ottoman period it lost its importance.

See also

List of settlements in Arcadia

References

The Franks in the Peloponnese, H. F. Tozer, Journal of Hellenic Studies, Vol. 4, 1883 (1883), pp. 165–236

External links
History and information about Veligosti
Veligosti on GTP Travel Pages

Populated places in Arcadia, Peloponnese